Triathlon at the 2015 Southeast Asian Games was held in East Coast Park, Singapore from 6 to 7 June 2015.

Participating nations
A total of 21 athletes from six nations competed in triathlon at the 2015 Southeast Asian Games:

Medalists

Medal table

References

External links
  

2015
Southeast Asian Games
2015 Southeast Asian Games events